Linda Strommen is an American oboist. She is Professor of Oboe at Indiana University and has been a regular visiting Oboe Instructor at the Juilliard School of Music for more than ten years. A former member of the Metropolitan Opera Orchestra and the Santa Fe Opera, she has held principal and assistant principal position with Milwaukee, Honolulu, New Heaven, Wichita, and Baton Rouge Symphonies and acting principal oboe positions with the Rochester Philharmonic and the St. Paul Chamber Orchestra.  In addition to being a former member of the Timm and Lieurance Woodwind Quintets, she has been a regular participant in summer festivals such as the Marlboro, Bellingham, Bard and Masterworks Festivals. Ms. Strommen commissioned and premiered the oboe concerto for oboe and string orchestra “Down a River of Time” by Eric Ewazen. Her recording of this work with the International Sejong Soloists, “Sejong Plays Ewazen,” has been released by Albany records.

One of the most sought-after oboe pedagogues of our day, Ms. Strommen held positions as Professor of Oboe at Louisiana State University and Wichita State University; Oboe Instructor at Mannes College of Music, the Juilliard Pre-College, State University of New York at Purchase, University of Hawaii, and adjunct faculty at Yale University. For many years Ms. Strommen has been teaching on the summer faculties of Le Domain Forget Music and Dance Academy and the John Mack Oboe Camp. She has recently joined the faculty of the Interlochen Arts Camp.

Ms. Strommen attended the Cleveland Institute of Music where she was a pupil of John Mack. She took additional studies with Ray Still, Richard Woodhams, Robert Bloom, and Stephen Colburn, and has recorded on Telarc, Deutsche Grammophon, Sony, Summit, and Albany labels. Ms. Strommen currently serves on the advisory committees of the Milwaukee Youth Symphony Orchestra and the Alexander Schneider Concert/New York String Orchestra Seminar.

In 2010 Strommen commissioned and premiered the Concerto for Oboe and Wind Ensemble by Eric Ewazen.

External links
 Linda Strommen

Living people
American classical oboists
Interlochen summer faculty
Women oboists
Year of birth missing (living people)
Cleveland Institute of Music alumni
20th-century classical musicians
20th-century American musicians
20th-century American women musicians
21st-century classical musicians
21st-century American musicians
21st-century American women musicians
American women academics